Tarutyne Raion was a raion (administrative division) in Odesa Oblast in southwestern Ukraine.  It was in the historical region of Budjak in southern Bessarabia and its administrative seat was Tarutyne. The raion was abolished and its territory was merged into Bolhrad Raion on 18 July 2020 as part of the administrative reform of Ukraine, which reduced the number of raions of Odesa Oblast to seven.  The last estimate of the raion population was  

In the 2001 Ukrainian Census, the raion had a multi-ethnic population of 45,169 of which 38% were Bessarabian Bulgarians, 25% Ukrainians, 17% Moldovans, 14% Russians, and 6% Gagauz people.  The area was formerly home to a number of Bessarabia Germans, which could have once made up a majority in the surrounding areas.

Nature conservation 
There were several protected areas located in Tarutyne Raion:
 Staromanzyrs'kjy (botanical preserve)
 Dibrova Mohylevs'ka (landscape preserve)
 Dibrova Manzyrs'ka (landscape preserve)
 Tarutyns'kyj steppe (landscape preserve)

References

External links
  Tarutynskyi Raion
  Tarutynskyi Raion

Former raions of Odesa Oblast
Bulgarian communities in Ukraine
1957 establishments in Ukraine
Ukrainian raions abolished during the 2020 administrative reform